Ralston is an unincorporated community in Adams County, Washington, United States. Ralston is assigned the ZIP code 99169.

A post office called Ralston was established in 1908, and remained in operation until 1974. The community took its name from the food.

References

Unincorporated communities in Adams County, Washington
Unincorporated communities in Washington (state)